Barkarby is a district of Järfälla Municipality, Stockholm County, Sweden and part of the contiguously built-up Stockholm urban area.

Barkarby has a station of the Stockholm commuter rail network.

1912 Summer Olympics
During the 1912 Summer Olympics, it hosted the endurance trials for the equestrian eventing competition.

The equestrian part of the modern pentathlon competition also took place here.

See also
Barkarby Airport

References
1912 Summer Olympics official report. pp. 82, 85.

Stockholm urban area
Venues of the 1912 Summer Olympics
Sports venues in Stockholm
Olympic modern pentathlon venues